Kirkland, more commonly known as Porter's Neck, was a census-designated place (CDP) in New Hanover County, North Carolina, United States. Redesignated as Porters Neck CDP for the 2010 census, the population was 6,204. It is part of the Wilmington Metropolitan Statistical Area.

Geography
Kirkland is located at  (34.301093, -77.787467).

Demographics

2020 census

As of the 2020 United States census, there were 7,397 people, 3,087 households, and 2,282 families residing in the CDP.

2000 census
As of the census of 2000, there were 579 people, 212 households, and 160 families residing in the CDP. The population density was 69.0 people per square mile (26.6/km2). There were 231 housing units at an average density of 27.5/sq mi (10.6/km2). The racial makeup of the CDP was 64.08% White, 33.85% African American, 0.17% Native American, 0.35% Asian, and 1.55% from two or more races. Hispanic or Latino of any race were 2.07% of the population.

There were 212 households, out of which 33.0% had children under the age of 18 living with them, 59.0% were married couples living together, 12.3% had a female householder with no husband present, and 24.5% were non-families. 21.7% of all households were made up of individuals, and 5.7% had someone living alone who was 65 years of age or older. The average household size was 2.73 and the average family size was 3.18.

In the CDP, the population was spread out, with 24.5% under the age of 18, 6.2% from 18 to 24, 30.9% from 25 to 44, 28.5% from 45 to 64, and 9.8% who were 65 years of age or older. The median age was 38 years. For every 100 females, there were 96.3 males. For every 100 females age 18 and over, there were 95.1 males.

The median income for a household in the CDP was $56,292, and the median income for a family was $57,083. Males had a median income of $34,063 versus $22,614 for females. The per capita income for the CDP was $21,439. About 8.2% of families and 10.2% of the population were below the poverty line, including none of those under age 18 and 15.9% of those age 65 or over.

References

Census-designated places in New Hanover County, North Carolina
Census-designated places in North Carolina
Cape Fear (region)